is a train station in Takeo, Saga Prefecture, Japan. It is operated by JR Kyushu and is on the Sasebo Line.

Lines
Only Sasebo Line local services stop at this station.

Station layout 
The station, which is unstaffed, consists of two staggered side platforms serving two tracks. The station building is a timber structure which is presently unstaffed and serves only as a waiting room. Access to the opposite side platform is by means of a footbridge.

Adjacent stations

History
Japanese Government Railways (JGR) opened the station on 30 September 1942 as Nagao signal box on the existing track of the Sasebo Line. On 15 January 1949, the facility was upgraded to a full station and passenger services commenced. With the privatization of Japanese National Railways (JNR), the successor of JGR, on 1 April 1987, control of the station passed to JR Kyushu.

Passenger statistics
In fiscal 2015, there were a total of 19,957 boarding passengers, giving a daily average of 55 passengers.

Environs
National Route 35

See also
 List of railway stations in Japan

References

External links
Nagao Station (JR Kyushu)

Railway stations in Japan opened in 1949
Sasebo Line
Railway stations in Saga Prefecture